There are currently 38 law schools in Australia. Only one of the 39 member institutions of Universities Australia has no law school: Federation University.

Current law schools

There are currently 2 non-university providers who offer accredited law degrees:

Legal Profession Admission Board
Top Education Institute - Sydney City School of Law

There are currently 2 non-university providers who offer practical legal training:

The College of Law Australia
Leo Cussen Institute

See also
Lists of law schools
Australian Law Students Association
Group of Eight law schools

References

Legal education in Australia
 
Australia